José Luis Talamillo Huidobro (6 July 1933 – 31 December 1965) was a Spanish cyclist, who competed as a professional from 1957 until 1965.

Career
Talamillo was a professional from 1956 until his death in 1965. As a road cyclist he won, among other things, the GP Villafranca de Ordizia in 1959 and the Setmana Catalana de Ciclisme in 1965. During the 1961 Vuelta a España, Talamillo held the leader's jersey for two days. He also rode in the 1964 Giro d'Italia, finishing 59th overall.

He was also an accomplished cyclo-cross cyclist, and won the Spanish National Cyclo-cross Championships six times. He also finished 8th in the world championships in 1961.

Death
Talamillo was killed in a traffic accident on the road between Burgos and Logroño on December 31, 1965, leaving behind a wife and two children.

Major results

Road

1957
 2nd GP Portugalete
1958
 1st Stage 3 Vuelta a La Rioja
 1st GP Mugica
 2nd GP Villafranca de Ordizia
1959
 1st GP Villafranca de Ordizia
 1st GP Mugica
 2nd GP Llodio
1960
 2nd GP Ayutamiento de Bilbao
 5th Subida a Arrate
1961
 4th Campeonato Vasco Navarro de Montaña
 8th Overall Euskal Bizikleta
1962
 1st Stage 1 Vuelta a La Rioja
 2nd Subida al Naranco
1964
 2nd Road race, National Road Championships
1965
 1st  Overall Setmana Catalana de Ciclisme
 2nd Gran Premio Fedrácion Catalana de Ciclismo
 3rd Overall Euskal Bizikleta
 3rd Trofeo Juan Fina
 4th Subida al Naranco

Cyclo-cross

1955–1956
 3rd National Championships
1957–1958
 1st  National Championships
1958–1959
 1st  National Championships
1959–1960
 1st  National Championships
 10th UCI World Championships
1960–1961
 2nd National Championships
 8th UCI World Championships
1961–1962
 1st  National Championships
1962–1963
 1st  National Championships
1964–1965
 1st  National Championships

References

External links

1933 births
1965 deaths
Spanish male cyclists
Sportspeople from Burgos
Cyclists from Castile and León